Count  was a statesman, diplomat and interim prime minister, active in Meiji, Taishō and Shōwa period Japan. He was also known as Uchida Yasuya.

Biography 

Uchida was born in what is now Yatsushiro city, Kumamoto Prefecture, as the son of the domain's doctor. After studying English for two years at Doshisha University, Uchida moved to Tokyo Imperial University, graduating from its law school.

After graduation, Uchida entered the Ministry of Foreign Affairs, and served as ambassador to Qing dynasty China, then as ambassador to Austria-Hungary, and then to the United States. He served as Japanese foreign minister from 1911 to 1912 under the 2nd Saionji Kinmochi administration.

Appointed as ambassador to the Empire of Russia just before the Bolshevik Revolution, Uchida returned to Japan to serve as Foreign Minister again from 1918 to 1923 under the Hara, Takahashi, and Katō administrations. He served as acting Prime Minister of Japan twice – once after the assassination of Prime Minister Hara, and again after the sudden death of Prime Minister Katō, immediately before the Great Kantō earthquake.

He was appointed to the House of Peers in the Diet of Japan in 1930, and became President of the South Manchuria Railway company in 1931.

Under his third term as Foreign Minister, from 1932 to 1933, during the Saitō Makoto administration, he called for the formal diplomatic recognition of Manchukuo, and later called for Japan's withdrawal from the League of Nations. He was featured on the cover of Time, 5 September 1932 edition, which also contained an article on his stance vis-à-vis the League of Nations. He died of illness 15 days after the 26 February Incident. His grave is at the Tama Reien at Fuchu, Tokyo.

In popular culture

 References 
 Beasley, W. G. Japanese Imperialism 1894–1945. Oxford University Press. 
 Gluck, Carol, and Stephen Graubard, ed. Showa: The Japan of Hirohito''. W. W. Norton & Company; Reprint edition (August 1993). 

|-

|-

|-

|-

|-

1865 births
1936 deaths
20th-century prime ministers of Japan
Ambassadors of Japan to Austria-Hungary
Ambassadors of Japan to China
Ambassadors of Japan to Russia
Ambassadors of Japan to the United States
Doshisha University alumni
Foreign ministers of Japan
Kazoku
Members of the House of Peers (Japan)
People of Meiji-period Japan
People from Kumamoto Prefecture
Prime Ministers of Japan
University of Tokyo alumni